Ntete is a village in Ancuabe District in Cabo Delgado Province in northeastern Mozambique.

Transport 

References

External links  
 Satellite map at Maplandia.com

Populated places in Ancuabe District